Cleveland is a city in the U.S. state of Texas, within Houston–The Woodlands–Sugar Land metropolitan area and Liberty County. The population was 7,471 at the 2020 census.

History 
In 1854, a church and convent were built by Father Peter La Cour near the town's present site. The town began forming in 1878 when Charles Lander Cleveland, a local judge, donated  of land to the Houston East & West Texas Railway (now part of the Union Pacific Railroad) for use as a stop, requesting that the town be named for him.  Since 1900 Cleveland has served as the junction of this line and the Gulf, Colorado and Santa Fe (now the BNSF Railway). The town was not incorporated until 1935.

The forests around Cleveland, including Sam Houston National Forest, which is located just to its north, are a resort for many inhabitants of the Houston area, who come to camp, hike, hunt, and fish. Cleveland has several historic sites and public recreational facilities, including two parks. The Austin Memorial Library Center offers a wide range of services to the community, and the Texan Theater and the annual livestock show and rodeo, Dairy Days, provide entertainment. Commercially, Cleveland has been a shipping point for timber, lumber, and lumber byproducts since the 1870s. A large medical community, oil, gas, cattle, farm products, and sand and gravel are important to the town's economy. The general trend toward urbanization of the entire area is reflected by the fact that in 1965 Liberty County was added to the Houston Standard Metropolitan Statistical Area. The population of Cleveland grew from 1,200 in 1930 to 7,605 according to the census of 2000.

In 2011, 19 young men and teens from Cleveland were arrested for gang rapes of an 11-year-old girl. Ultimately, 21 persons were found or pled guilty and received sentences ranging from life in prison to probation.

Geography and climate 
Cleveland's northern boundary is made by the Sam Houston National Forest. The climate is characterized by hot, humid summers and generally mild to cool winters. According to the Köppen climate classification system, Cleveland has a humid subtropical climate, Cfa on climate maps.

Demographics 

As of the 2020 United States census, there were 7,471 people, 2,729 households, and 1,873 families residing in the city.

As of the 2010 census, Cleveland had a population of 7,675.  The racial and ethnic makeup of the population was 45.7%  White, 23.7% Black, 1.3% Asian, 13.0% from other races, and 2.5% from two or more races; 27.8% was Hispanic or Latino of any race.

As of the census of 2000,  7,605 people, 2,645 households, and 1,758 families resided in the city. The population density was 1,580.5 people per square mile (610.5/km). The 2,976 housing units averaged 618.5 per square mile (238.9/km). The racial makeup of the city was 58.65% White, 27.13% African American, 0.33% Native American, 0.59% Asian, 11.58% from other races, and 1.72% from two or more races. Hispanics or Latino of any race were 20.51% of the population.

Of the 2,645 households, 34.0% had children under the age of 18 living with them, 42.4% were married couples living together, 19.0% had a female householder with no husband present, and 33.5% were not families. About 29.2% of all households were made up of individuals, and 13.9% had someone living alone who was 65 years of age or older. The average household size was 2.63 and the average family size was 3.27.

In the city, the population was distributed 27.4% under the age of 18, 10.7% from 18 to 24, 29.6% from 25 to 44, 18.3% from 45 to 64, and 14.0% who were 65 years of age or older. The median age was 33 years. For every 100 females, there were 101.0 males. For every 100 females age 18 and over, there were 101.7 males.

The median income for a household in the city was $24,164, and for a family was $28,527. Males had a median income of $28,385 versus $17,889 for females. The per capita income for the city was $13,562. About 19.3% of families and 22.4% of the population were below the poverty line, including 31.8% of those under age 18 and 16.1% of those age 65 or over.

Government 
Cleveland operates under the council-manager form of government. Under this system, the mayor and five council members appoint the city manager, who acts as the chief executive officer of the government. The city manager carries out policy and administers city programs. All department heads, including the city attorney, police chief, and fire chief, are ultimately responsible to the city manager. All city council positions are officially nonpartisan. The city operates and maintains these divisions:

 Administration
 Police
 Fire/EMS
 Water and sewer utilities
 Streets
 Building inspection and code enforcement
 Library
 Parks
 Airport
 Cemetery

The Cleveland Unit, a prison for men privately operated by the GEO Group, Inc. on behalf of the Texas Department of Criminal Justice, is in the city,  from downtown Cleveland.

Education 
The city served by the Cleveland Independent School District.

The Tarkington Independent School District, located east southeast of the city of Cleveland, also has a Cleveland zipcode.

Residents of Cleveland ISD (and therefore Cleveland) are served by the Lone Star College System (formerly North Harris Montgomery Community College). Tarkington ISD residents are also in Lone Star.

Transportation

Highways 
The major route traveling through Cleveland is U.S. Highway 59, soon to be renamed Interstate 69, traveling southwest towards Houston and northeast into East Texas. U.S. 59 goes through the cities of Livingston, Lufkin, and Nacogdoches, and onward to Texarkana, Texas. US 59 is designated as the TTC-I-69 Corridor. U.S. Highway 59 Business  is the original route of U.S. 59, which runs north and south through the center of Cleveland, known locally as Washington Avenue and Loop 573. A current limited-access bypass for U.S. 59 was created due to traffic densities in downtown Cleveland that rivaled those of many large cities. SH 105  travels east and west, and Cleveland is roughly the halfway point between Beaumont and Navasota. SH 105 runs concurrently with SH 321 until SH 105 splits, going eastbound to Beaumont, while SH 321 continues roughly  further south into Dayton. Construction was recently completed on a loop coming off SH 105 near Pin Oak Road, along the southern side of Cleveland, crossing Interstate 69 and FM 1010, and terminating at SH 321 near New Salem Road.

Railroads 
Cleveland is the meeting point of two rail lines. One is a north/south Union Pacific line that closely follows the path of Interstate 69. Union Tank Car Company has a tank repair/maintenance facility along the BNSF line on the outskirts of Cleveland off FM 787.

Airports 
Cleveland Municipal Airport, a general-aviation airport, is in Cleveland. George Bush Intercontinental Airport in Houston is the closest airport with commercial airline service.

Notable people 

 Jason Grimsley was born in Cleveland and went to school in Tarkington ISD, just east of town on State Hwy 321. Grimsley pitched for the Philadelphia Phillies, Cleveland Indians, Anaheim Angels, New York Yankees, Kansas City Royals, Baltimore Orioles, and Arizona Diamondbacks
 Gib Lewis, a Speaker of the Texas House of Representatives, spent his formative years in Cleveland.  He graduated from Cleveland High School in 1955 and enrolled at Sam Houston State College (now Sam Houston State University ) in Huntsville, Texas. Elected speaker for the first time in 1983, Lewis became the first to hold that office for five terms

References

External links 

 

Cities in Texas
Cities in Liberty County, Texas
Greater Houston
Populated places established in 1935
1935 establishments in Texas